"Dive Bar" is a song recorded by Canadian country artist Gord Bamford. The song was co-written by Tebey, Kylie Sackley, and Matthew Rogers. It was the third single from Bamford's studio album Neon Smoke, and his second #1 hit on the Billboard Canada Country chart.

Music video
The official music video for "Dive Bar" was directed by Stephano Barberis and premiered on July 13, 2018. The video was part of a social media engagement campaign, and finds Bamford in a crowded dive bar.

Charts
"Dive Bar" reached a peak of #1 on the Billboard Canada Country chart for the week of September 22, 2018, marking his second Number One hit after "When Your Lips Are So Close".

References

2018 songs
2018 singles
Gord Bamford songs
Sony Music singles
Songs written by Tebey
Music videos directed by Stephano Barberis
Songs written by Kylie Sackley